Ágnes Mutina (born 19 April 1988 in Miskolc, Borsod-Abaúj-Zemplén) is a female Hungarian swimmer, who competed three times for her native country at the Summer Olympics; in 2004, 2008 and 2012.

In 2010 at the European Championships held in her home country she came fourth in the 4×100 m freestyle and became European champion as part of the 4×200 m freestyle relay team.

References

1988 births
Living people
Hungarian female swimmers
Hungarian female freestyle swimmers
Olympic swimmers of Hungary
Swimmers at the 2004 Summer Olympics
Swimmers at the 2008 Summer Olympics
Swimmers at the 2012 Summer Olympics
Sportspeople from Miskolc
European Aquatics Championships medalists in swimming
20th-century Hungarian women
21st-century Hungarian women